In algebraic geometry, a branch of mathematics, the étale spectrum of a commutative ring or an E∞-ring, denoted by Specét or Spét, is an analog of the prime spectrum Spec of a commutative ring that is obtained by replacing Zariski topology with étale topology. The precise definition depends on one's formalism. But the idea of the definition itself is simple. The usual prime spectrum Spec enjoys the relation: for a scheme (S, OS) and a commutative ring A,

where Hom on the left is for morphisms of schemes and Hom on the right ring homomorphisms. This is to say Spec is the right adjoint to the global section functor . So, roughly, one can (and typically does) simply define the étale spectrum Spét to be the right adjoint to the global section functor on the category of "spaces" with étale topology.

Over a field of characteristic zero, K. Behrend constructs the étale spectrum of a graded algebra called a perfect resolving algebra. He then defines a differential graded scheme (a type of a derived scheme) as one that is étale-locally such an étale spectrum.

The notion makes sense in the usual algebraic geometry but appears more frequently in the context of derived algebraic geometry.

Notes

References 

Algebraic geometry